Andrew F. Warga (1919-1998) was a member of the Wisconsin State Assembly in the USA.

Biography
Warga was born on February 12, 1919, in Thayer, Illinois. During World War II, he served in the United States Army. He was a member of the American Legion and the Veterans of Foreign Wars.

He died in Florida on February 26, 1998.

Political career
Warga was elected to the Assembly in 1958. He was a Democrat.

References

People from Sangamon County, Illinois
Democratic Party members of the Wisconsin State Assembly
Military personnel from Wisconsin
United States Army soldiers
United States Army personnel of World War II
1919 births
1998 deaths
20th-century American politicians